Eucyllus is a genus of broad-nosed weevils in the beetle family Curculionidae. There are about eight described species in Eucyllus.

Species
These eight species belong to the genus Eucyllus:
 Eucyllus carinarostris Pelsue and Sleeper, 1972 i c g
 Eucyllus cinereus Pelsue and Sleeper, 1972 i c g
 Eucyllus echinus Van Dyke, 1936 i c g
 Eucyllus horridus Hatch, 1971 i c g
 Eucyllus nevadensis (Casey, 1888) i c g
 Eucyllus saesariatus Pelsue & Sleeper, 1972 i c g b
 Eucyllus unicolor Van Dyke, 1936 i c g
 Eucyllus vagans Horn, 1876 i c g b
Data sources: i = ITIS, c = Catalogue of Life, g = GBIF, b = Bugguide.net

References

Further reading

 
 
 
 

Entiminae
Articles created by Qbugbot